Merely Mary Ann a 1931 American pre-Code romantic comedy drama film starring Janet Gaynor and Charles Farrell. Gaynor and Farrell made almost a dozen films together, including Frank Borzage's classics 7th Heaven (1927), Street Angel (1928), and Lucky Star (1929); Gaynor won the first Academy Award for Best Actress for the first two and F. W. Murnau's Sunrise: A Song of Two Humans. The film, involving an orphan (Gaynor) and a flat-broke composer (Farrell), was written by Jules Furthman based upon Israel Zangwill's play of the same name and directed by Henry King.

Plot
Orphan drudge Mary Ann finds love and hope in the arms of a promising but poor composer, John Lonsdale.

Cast
 Janet Gaynor as Mary Ann
 Charles Farrell as John Lonsdale
 Beryl Mercer as Mrs. Leadbatter
 J. M. Kerrigan as First Drayman
 Tom Whiteley as Second Drayman
 Lorna Balfour as Lorna Leadbatter
 Arnold Lucy as Vicar Smedge
 G. P. Huntley as Peter Brooke
 Harry Rosenthal

References

External links

  (Original novel)

1931 films
American black-and-white films
1930s English-language films
American films based on plays
Films directed by Henry King
1930s romantic comedy-drama films
American romantic comedy-drama films
Films with screenplays by Jules Furthman
Fox Film films
1931 comedy films
1931 drama films
1930s American films
Silent romantic comedy-drama films
Silent American comedy-drama films